On April 15, 1861, at the start of the American Civil War, U.S. President Abraham Lincoln called for a 75,000-man militia to serve for three months following the bombardment and surrender of Fort Sumter. Some southern states refused to send troops against the neighboring Deep South slave states of South Carolina, Mississippi, Florida, Alabama, Georgia, Louisiana, and Texas. The result was that most states in the Upper South of Virginia, Arkansas, North Carolina, and Tennessee also declared secession from the United States and joined the Confederate States. 

In Missouri and Kentucky, pro-Confederate state governments were formed. Although neither managed to seize effective control, they were duly recognized by the Confederacy with these states being admitted as the 12th and 13th Confederate states, respectively. Meanwhile, movement towards secession was forcibly suppressed by Federal troops in Maryland and not attempted in Delaware, with both states staying in the Union throughout the duration of the war.

Background
In April 1861. the Regular Army of the United States consisted of approximately 16,000 officers and soldiers organized into ten regiments of infantry, four of artillery, two of cavalry, two of dragoons, and one of mounted rifles. These regiments were mostly posted in small forts of company-sized detachments. The majority posted west of the Mississippi River. Following the secession of seven states in December 1860 and the creation of the Confederate States of America in February 1861, many officers and soldiers resigned, or were in the process of resigning from the U.S. Army to join the Army of the Confederacy.

Legal limits
Until the early 20th century, the United States relied on calling out militia and volunteers rather than expanding the regular army. However, there were restrictions on the number of men and the length of time they could serve in these capacities. State governors had more authority than the President of the United States to extend their service. Section 4 of the Militia Act of 1795 provided:
 

On March 2, 1799 the number of militia members able to be called by the president for a provisional army was limited to 75,000 men. Prior to the Civil War, this limit had never been adjusted to reflect the growth in the nation's population, which increased from approximately 5.3 million in 1800 to more than 31 million in 1860. During that time, there had not been a domestic insurrection in the United States even on the scale of the short-lived Whiskey Rebellion of the early 1790s, and therefore little impetus for Congress to reconsider the numerical limits to the militia that had been codified in the late eighteenth century.

Declaration
The declaration by Lincoln read:

Secretary of War Simon Cameron's communique to the various state governors
CALL   TO    ARMS ! !

Reaction and resistance
Rather than calling for 75,000 military volunteers from any American state or territory, the two proclamations called for a specific number of volunteers from each state. The Secretary of War's proclamation included slave states in the South that had not yet declared their secession but excluded two free states on the Pacific coast (California and Oregon). At the time, a transcontinental railroad, which would have been necessary to transport troops from nation's far western regions with any sort of ease, had not yet been built. Recently admitted Kansas was also excluded.

Several northern states communicated enthusiasm with states such as Indiana offering twice as many volunteers as requested. Massachusetts volunteers reached Washington D.C. as early as April 19.

Governor Henry Rector of Arkansas stated, "The people of this Commonwealth are freemen, not slaves, and will defend to the last extremity their honor, lives, and property, against Northern mendacity and usurpation."

Governor Beriah Magoffin of Kentucky declared that they would not send volunteers to a Northern army intent on subjugating their Southern brethren.

Governor Claiborne Jackson of Missouri responded that, "Not one man will the state of Missouri furnish to carry on any such unholy crusade"

Governor John Ellis of North Carolina replied in a telegram to Secretary of War Simon Cameron, "I can be no party to this wicked violation of the laws of the country, and to this war upon the liberties of a free people. You can get no troops from North Carolina".

Governor Isham Harris of Tennessee stated in a telegram to Lincoln, "Tennessee will furnish not a single man for the purpose of coercion, but fifty thousand if necessary for the defense of our rights and those of our Southern brothers."

Governor John Letcher of Virginia, whose state had been requested to furnish three regiments totalling 5,340 men and officers, had stated in the past his intent for his state to remain neutral. In a letter to Lincoln, he declared that since the president had "chosen to inaugurate civil war, he would be sent no troops from the Old Dominion."

Subsequent actions
In early May, Lincoln issued a second call, requesting an additional 42,000 men. On May 3, Lincoln issued a further call for United States Volunteers to serve three years with regiments being organized by state governments. He increased the regular U.S. Army by 22,714 men and called for 42,034 more volunteers to enlist for three years. In July 1861, the U.S. Congress sanctioned Lincoln's acts and authorized 500,000 additional volunteers.

Notes

External links

19th-century history of the United States Army
Politics of the American Civil War
Social history of the American Civil War
 Social history of the United States
 American Civil War documents
1861 documents
 Presidency of Abraham Lincoln
Proclamations
1861 in the United States
April 1861 events